The 2022 Delaware State Hornets football team represented Delaware State University as a member of the Mid-Eastern Athletic Conference (MEAC) in the 2022 NCAA Division I FCS football season. The Hornets, led by fifth-year head coach Rod Milstead, played their home games at Alumni Stadium.

Previous season

The Hornets finished the 2021 season with a record of 5–6, 2–3 MEAC play to finish in a tie for third place.

Schedule

Game summaries

Lincoln (PA)

at Delaware

Virginia–Lynchburg

Merrimack

Robert Morris

at Norfolk State

at Howard

North Carolina Central

at South Carolina State

Morgan State

Campbell

References

Delaware State
Delaware State Hornets football seasons
Delaware State Hornets football